Sankofa Shule was a charter school in Lansing, Michigan.

The school's name is a mix of Akan and Swahili words.

History
It was established in 1995. Its original enrollment was 116. For a period it occupied a building that also had a beauty school. The charter school's authorizer was Central Michigan University.

By 2002 CMU and the school were involved in a conflict over finances.

In 2007 CMU stopped renewing the charter, and the school closed.

Operations
The school used "Baba" and "Mama", from Swahili, as ways to address male and female teachers, and it used variations of the buba as its school uniform. The school featured prominent African-Americans in its decorations.

Students were placed in classes organized by ability instead of traditional grade level classes.

The physical education curricula included dance styles from the African continent.

Curriculum
The school used an Afrocentric curriculum. The school had foreign language classes for Swahili, French, Japanese, and Spanish.

See also
 El-Hajj Malik El-Shabazz Academy – Afrocentric charter school in Lansing established in 1995 and closed in 2019
 List of public school academy districts in Michigan

References
  – ISBNs for the Google Books pages: 1412940508, 9781412940504 – see entry in the thesaurus

Notes

External links
 

Buildings and structures in Lansing, Michigan
Education in Lansing, Michigan
Charter schools in Michigan
1995 establishments in Michigan
Educational institutions established in 1995
2007 disestablishments in Michigan
Educational institutions disestablished in 2007